Potato digger may refer to:
 a person digging potatoes out of the ground 
 Potato spinner, an agricultural machine
 M1895 Colt–Browning, a machine gun nicknamed potato digger